Arabinogalactan endo-beta-1,4-galactanase (endo-1,4-beta-galactanase, galactanase, arabinogalactanase, ganB (gene)) is an enzyme with systematic name arabinogalactan 4-beta-D-galactanohydrolase. This enzyme catalyses the following chemical reaction

 The enzyme specifically hydrolyses (1->4)-beta-D-galactosidic linkages in type I arabinogalactans.

This enzyme is isolated from the bacterium Bacillus subtilis.

References

External links 
 

EC 3.2.1